James Rust (1798 – 24 July 1875) was a British Conservative politician.

Rust was first elected Conservative MP for Huntingdonshire at a by-election in 1855—caused by the succession of William Montagu to 7th Duke of Manchester. He was again elected at the 1857 general election, although the vote unusually resulted in a triple return with his fellow incumbent Conservative MP Edward Fellowes securing the same number of votes as the Whig cricketer John Heathcote. After scrutiny, Heathcote was declared unduly elected a few months later. Rust held the seat until the 1859 general election when he did not stand.

References

External links
 

Conservative Party (UK) MPs for English constituencies
UK MPs 1852–1857
UK MPs 1857–1859
1798 births
1875 deaths